Hello America is the seventh album by Blue System. It was edited in 1992 under the label BMG Ariola and was produced by Dieter Bohlen. The album contains 11 new tracks. "I Will Survive" and "Romeo and Juliet" were released as singles from the album.

Track listing

Charts

References

External links

Blue System albums
1992 albums
Bertelsmann Music Group albums